Love and Hate: The Natural History of Behavior Patterns is a 1970 book by the ethnologist Irenäus Eibl-Eibesfeldt.

Love and Hate was reviewed in Current Anthropology.

References

1970 non-fiction books
Anthropology books
Books by Irenäus Eibl-Eibesfeldt
German books